Forward Kahuta the population of small town is about 32000 it is a Small Town and Municipality serve as District headquarter of Haveli District of Pakistani Azad Kashmir. It was part of district Bagh but in 2009, it was separated from Bagh, in July 2009. Choudary Muhammad Aziz Chohan is founder of this district. The city is small and beautiful markets, where all needy things are available.
Historically this place was very important for  all those emperor's that would wanted to establish their empire on the Northern areas and other parts of Kashmir.
At that time the main power on this region was Tanoli Tribe (Descendants of Khilji ) and their state Amb Darband Ruled By Malik Abdul Qadir (founder of free Amb Movement after independence), great-grandfather Mir Jehandad Khan Tanoli, was a tribal chief of the Tanoli people and the state headquarter was in Darband.
 The Headquarter of district Bagh city Bagh is 65km and Headquarter of poonch district city rawalakot is 100km from Forward Kahuta.

References
Hazara Gazetteer
Allen, Charles (2012). Soldier Sahibs: The Men Who Made the North-West Frontier. Hachette. p. 96.
Khan, Shahrukh Rafi; Khan, Foqia Sadiq; Akhtar, Aasim Sajjad (2007). Initiating Devolution for Service Delivery in Pakistan: Ignoring the Power Structure. Oxford University Press. p. 129.
"The Herald (Pakistan), 2006". Herald. Vol. 37 no. 4–6. 2006. p. 101. The Tanolis' own history classifies them conflictingly as either Pakhtuns from the vicinity of Ghazni or Turks of the Barlas sub-clan.
Hazara Gazetteer, 1907
Tariq, Muhammad (2017). Genetic Analysis of the Major Tribes of Buner and Swabi Areas through Dental Morphology and DNA Analysis (PDF) (Ph.D. thesis). Hazara University, Mansehra.

Populated places in Haveli District